The 2021–22 North Carolina Tar Heels men's basketball team represented the University of North Carolina at Chapel Hill during the 2021–22 NCAA Division I men's basketball season. The team was coached by Hubert Davis, in his first season as UNC's head coach after the retirement of longtime coach Roy Williams. The Tar Heels played their home games at the Dean Smith Center in Chapel Hill, North Carolina, as members of the Atlantic Coast Conference.

They finished the season 29–10 overall and 15–5 in ACC play to finish in a tie for second place.  As the third seed in the ACC tournament, they defeated sixth seed Virginia in the Quarterfinals before losing to seventh seed and eventual champions Virginia Tech in the Semifinals.  They earned an at-large bid to the NCAA tournament and were the eighth seed in the East Region.  They made it all the way to the National Championship game where they lost to Kansas to end their run despite leading by as many as 16 before halftime.

Previous season
The Tar Heels finished the 2020–21 season 18–11, 10–6 in ACC play to finish in a tie for fifth place. On February 27, 2021, head coach Roy Williams won his 900th career game in a win over Florida State, becoming the 5th and fastest Division 1 men's head coach to reach the milestone. On March 6, 2021, UNC completed a season sweep over rival Duke in a 91–73 win. Following the win, Roy Williams kissed the Smith Center court, causing speculation of possible retirement. Williams later said it was because of the team's 10–1 home record. As the No. 6 seed in the ACC tournament, they defeated Notre Dame and Virginia Tech, before losing to Florida State in the semifinals. The Virginia Tech win would end up as Williams' 903rd and last win as a coach. North Carolina received an at-large bid to the NCAA tournament as a No. 8 seed and would lose in the first round to 9th-seeded Wisconsin in what would be Roy Williams' last game. Following the season, Roy Williams announced he would retire after 18 years as head coach of North Carolina.

Offseason
On April 1, 2021, Roy Williams announced his retirement. Williams stated that he didn't feel like he was the "right man for the job anymore". ESPN's Seth Greenberg suspected the changing culture of college basketball  and "constantly re-recruiting your players, as opposed to mentoring them" played a part in Williams' decision. Following the announcement, athletic director Bubba Cunningham and chancellor Kevin Guskiewicz started the process of searching for the next head coach. CBS Sports' Matt Norlander said "The best job in college basketball just opened". On April 5, 2021, UNC hired former player and assistant coach Hubert Davis as the next head coach. The next day, Davis was formally introduced at an introductory press conference.

Roster changes
Following UNC's loss to Wisconsin in the 2021 NCAA tournament, Sports Illustrated's Quierra Luck reported, "Carolina will have some transfers; a considerably high number for UNC" and Inside Carolina's Sherrell McMillan reported the offseason would be "ominous".

Three days later, freshman center Walker Kessler announced he was entering the NCAA's transfer portal. Inside Carolina reported that Kessler's decision was a "basketball decision only". On April 12, 2021, Kessler announced that he would transfer to Auburn for the 2021-22 season.

On March 24, 2021, freshman forward/center Day'Ron Sharpe declared for the 2021 NBA draft. On April 6, 2021 sophomore Armando Bacot also declared for the NBA draft, citing his intentions to "test the waters". On June 21, 2021 Bacot formally withdrew from the NBA draft process, signaling his return to UNC for his junior season in a tweet.

Redshirt junior Sterling Manley, walk-on senior Walker Miller, and senior forward Garrison Brooks all announced intentions to graduate and transfer. Brooks transferred to Mississippi State on April 15. On June 19, Miller announced he would be pursuing a graduate transfer at Monmouth University, and would be coached there by another former Tar Heel player in King Rice. Manley eventually pulled his name from the transfer portal and decided to turn professional. After graduation, guard Andrew Platek eventually put his name into the transfer portal, and enrolled at Siena College in his home state of New York.

Coach Davis was active in the transfer portal to mitigate these losses. On April 10, 2021, Virginia transfer Justin McKoy chose the Tar Heels. He was followed on April 16 by Oklahoma forward Brady Manek. On July 8, 2021, the Tar Heels picked up another transfer when former Marquette forward Dawson Garcia, a Big East All-Freshman team selection for the 2020–2021 season, committed to the Tar Heels. His addition was made official on July 9, when the school issued a press release indicating his signing and arrival in Chapel Hill.

Departures

Incoming transfers

2021 recruiting class

Roster      

 Shaver, a member of North Carolina's 2022 recruiting class, enrolled a semester early due to the Tar Heels having an extra scholarship available. He will redshirt for the remainder of the 2021–22 season.

Schedule and results

|-
!colspan=12 style=| Exhibition

|-
!colspan=12 style=| Regular Season

|-
!colspan=12 style=|ACC Tournament

|-
!colspan=12 style=| NCAA tournament

Rankings

*Coaches did not release a week 1 poll.

References

North Carolina Tar Heels men's basketball seasons
North Carolina
North Carolina Tar Heels men's basketball
North Carolina Tar Heels men's basketball
North Carolina
NCAA Division I men's basketball tournament Final Four seasons